John Maguire may refer to:

John Maguire (archbishop of Glasgow) (1851–1920), Scottish Roman Catholic prelate
John Maguire (coadjutor archbishop of New York) (1904–1989), American Roman Catholic prelate
John Maguire (cricketer) (born 1956), Australian cricketer
John Maguire (fighter) (born 1983), English mixed martial artist
John Maguire (Irish politician) (died 1872), Irish politician
John Maguire (Irish senator), Irish senator
John Maguire (rugby league), Australian former rugby league footballer
John A. Maguire (1870–1939), American politician
John D. Maguire (1932–2018), American college president
John M. Maguire, CEO of Friendly's

See also
Jack Maguire (disambiguation)
John McGuire (disambiguation)